Plagiostyles is a plant genus in the family Euphorbiaceae first described as a genus in 1897. It is native to tropical Africa.

Species
 Plagiostyles africana (Müll.Arg.) Prain - Nigeria, Cameroon, Gabon, Cabinda Province, Angola, Equatorial Guinea, Republic of the Congo, Democratic Republic of the Congo
 Plagiostyles pinnatus Willd. - Gabon

References

Stomatocalyceae
Euphorbiaceae genera
Flora of West-Central Tropical Africa
Flora of Nigeria